The Bosnian and former Yugoslav garage rock band Zabranjeno Pušenje since 1984 has released twelve studio albums, three live albums, three compilation albums, one soundtrack album and 47 music videos.

Albums
Source: Zabranjeno pušenje

Studio albums

Live albums

Compilation albums

Videos

Soundtrack albums

See also 
 List of songs recorded by Zabranjeno pušenje

References

External links
 Official website
 
 Zabranjeno pušenje discography at Discogs
 Zabranjeno pušenje discography at MusicBrainz

discography
Discographies of Bosnia and Herzegovina artists
Rock music group discographies